Hayworth Hicks (born October 3, 1988) is an American football offensive guard who is currently a free agent. He was signed by the Indianapolis Colts as an undrafted free agent in 2012. He played college football at Iowa State.  He has also been a member of the New York Jets, Kansas City Chiefs, Tampa Bay Buccaneers, Carolina Panthers, Orlando Predators and Arizona Rattlers.

Early years
Hicks attended Palmdale High School in Palmdale, California. He earned all-CIF Western Division honors and all-conference in his Junior and Senior season.

College career
Hicks played college football at Iowa State University. He was selected 2011 Second-team All-Big 12 team. In 2011, he was presented with the Iowa State’s Arthur Floyd Scott Award as Iowa State's most outstanding lineman.

Professional career

Indianapolis Colts
On April 30, 2012, Hicks signed with the Indianapolis Colts as an Undrafted free agent. On August 31, he was released on the day of roster cuts. On September 1, 2012, he was signed to the practice squad.

New York Jets
On November 7, 2012, Hicks was signed to the New York Jets active roster from the Indianapolis Colts practice squad. Hicks was waived on November 28, 2012.

Kansas City Chiefs
On November 29, 2012, Hicks was claimed off waivers by the Kansas City Chiefs.

Orlando Predators
On February 18, 2014, Hicks was assigned to the Orlando Predators of the Arena Football League.

Arizona Rattlers
On December 4, 2015, Hicks was assigned to the Arizona Rattlers.

Albany Empire
On March 20, 2018, Hicks was assigned to the Albany Empire. On July 18, 2018, Hicks was named the AFL's Offensive Lineman of the Year. On April 4, 2019, Hicks was assigned to the Empire again.

References

External links
 Iowa State Cyclones bio
 Indianapolis Colts bio
 New York Jets bio
 Carolina Panthers bio

1988 births
Living people
Albany Empire (AFL) players
American football offensive guards
Arizona Rattlers players
Carolina Panthers players
Indianapolis Colts players
Iowa State Cyclones football players
Kansas City Chiefs players
New York Jets players
Orlando Predators players
People from Palmdale, California
Players of American football from California
Sportspeople from Los Angeles County, California
Tampa Bay Buccaneers players